"Happiness" is a song by Scottish band The Blue Nile, which was released in 1996 as the lead single from their third studio album Peace at Last. It was written by Paul Buchanan and produced by the band. "Happiness" reached No. 88 in the UK Singles Chart and remained in the Top 100 for two weeks.

Critical reception
In a review of Peace at Last, The Dundee Courier & Advertiser wrote, "Peace at Last arrives in superb style with the opening 'Happiness', a song which has little to do with its title but is as magnificently grandiose as anything you're likely to hear." Music & Media described "Happiness" as "a great gospel song, climaxing with the help of a choir".

In a 1996 feature on the band, George Byrne said, "There's the presence of a gospel choir at the close of 'Happiness' which caused me to jump when I first heard it but even that departure from [the band's] usual form fits in perfectly with the tone of the song." Adrian Dawson of The Stage described the song as a "hymn to triumph over adversity".

Track listing
Cassette single
"Happiness" (Edit) – 4:28
"O Lolita" – 3:37

CD single (CD #1)
"Happiness" (Edit) – 4:28
"O Lolita" – 3:37
"War Is Love (A Different Day)" – 3:33

CD single (CD #2)
"Happiness" (Edit) – 4:28
"New York Man" – 3:55
"Wish Me Well" – 4:28

CD single (promo)
"Happiness" – 4:28

Personnel
The Blue Nile
 Paul Buchanan – vocals, guitar, synthesizer
 Robert Bell – bass, synthesizer
 Paul Joseph Moore – keyboards, synthesizer

Additional musicians
 Nigel Thomas – drums
 Eddie Tate & Friends – gospel choir

Production
 The Blue Nile – producers
 Calum Malcolm – engineer

Other
 The Blue Nile, Central – sleeve design

Charts

References

1996 songs
1996 singles
The Blue Nile songs
Warner Records singles